West Lafayette is a city in Wabash Township, Tippecanoe County, Indiana, United States, about  northwest of the state capital of Indianapolis and  southeast of Chicago. West Lafayette is directly across the Wabash River from its sister city, Lafayette.  As of the 2020 census, its population was 44,595.  It is the most densely populated city in Indiana and is home to Purdue University.

History

Augustus Wylie laid out a town in 1836 in the Wabash River floodplain south of the present Levee. Due to regular flooding of the site, Wylie's town was never built. The present city was formed in 1888 by the merger of the adjacent suburban towns of Chauncey, Oakwood, and Kingston, located on a bluff across the Wabash River from Lafayette, Indiana. The three towns had been small suburban villages which were directly adjacent to one another. Kingston was laid out in 1855 by Jesse B. Lutz. Chauncey was platted in 1860 by the Chauncey family of Philadelphia, wealthy land speculators. Chauncey and Kingston formed a municipal government in 1866 which selected the name "Chauncey".

The new town of Chauncey remained a small suburban village until Purdue University opened in 1869. In 1871 Chauncey voted to be annexed by Lafayette because it was unable to provide the infrastructure (such as improved streets, waterworks, police and fire protection). Lafayette voted against annexing Chauncey because of the high cost of the many improvements that the village lacked. In May 1888, the town of Chauncey voted to change its name to West Lafayette after a petition signed by 152 electors. By that time, the growth of the university was fueling the growth of the little town. The address of Purdue University was given as "Lafayette, Indiana" until well into the twentieth century. West Lafayette never gained a railroad depot and lagged several years behind Lafayette in the establishment of municipal infrastructure and services.  Today, West Lafayette has established itself as a separate city, with independent services and unique neighborhoods distinct from those of its sister city, Lafayette.

In November 2013, the City of West Lafayette approved an annexation that placed much of the Purdue University academic campus and residence hall system within the official boundaries of the municipality for the first time. This expansion also included a large section of the US Highway 231 corridor that was previously part of unincorporated Tippecanoe County.

Alpha Tau Omega Fraternity House, Jesse Andrew House, Chauncey-Stadium Avenues Historic District, John E. and Catherine E. Christian House, Curtis-Grace House, Happy Hollow Heights Historic District, Hills and Dales Historic District, Morton School, and The Varsity are listed on the National Register of Historic Places.

Geography
West Lafayette lies in central Tippecanoe County and overlooks the Wabash River, which borders the city on the east and south. Most of the city lies in eastern Wabash Township, though a small portion on the northeast side extends into Tippecanoe Township.

Neighborhoods 

 Avondale
 Bar Barry Heights
 Camelback
 Glenwood Heights
 Happy Hollow
 Hills and Dales
 New Chauncey Neighborhood
 Northwestern Heights
 Park Ridge
 Peppermill Village
 Plaza Park
 Prophets Ridge
 Stonebridge
 University Farm
 Wabash Shores

Demographics

2020 census
As of the census of 2020, there were 44,595 people living in the city.

2010 census
As of the census of 2010, there were 29,796 people, 11,945 households, and 4,072 families living in the city. The racial makeup of the city was 60.2% White, 9.8% African American, 0.1% Native American, 17.3% Asian, 1.9% from other races, and 2.1% from two or more races. Hispanic or Latino of any race were 7.6% of the population.

There were 11,945 households, of which, 16.0% had children under the age of 18 living with them, 27.2% were married couples living together, 4.4% had a female householder with no husband present, 2.5% had a male householder with no wife present, and 65.9% were non-families. 34.2% of all households were made up of individuals, and 7.9% had someone living alone who was 65 years of age or older. The average household size was 2.22 and the average family size was 2.92.

The median age in the city was 22.8 years. 11.8% of residents were under the age of 18; 49.4% were between the ages of 18 and 24; 18.4% were from 25 to 44; 11.7% were from 45 to 64; and 8.7% were 65 years of age or older. The gender makeup of the city was 54.2% male and 45.8% female.

Following the 2010 census, West Lafayette annexed additional territory including the Purdue University main campus. The census bureau released an updated report to reflect the boundary updates. The census now reports 14,053 households and a population of 44,910.

2000 census
As of the census of 2000, there were 28,778 people, 10,462 households, and 3,588 families living in the city. The racial makeup of the city was 69.3% White, 13.3% Asian, 8.4% African American, 0.2% Native American, <0.1% Pacific Islander, 1.2% from other races, and 1.6% from two or more races. Hispanic or Latino of any race were 9.2% of the population.

There were 10,462 households, out of which 14.9% had children under the age of 18 living with them, 27.6% were married couples living together, 4.4% had a female householder with no husband present, and 65.7% were non-families. 32.7% of all households were made up of individuals, and 7.3% had someone living alone who was 65 years of age or older. The average household size was 2.26 and the average family size was 2.89.

In the city, the population was spread out, with 10.4% under the age of 18, 54.6% from 18 to 24, 16.9% from 25 to 44, 10.3% from 45 to 64, and 7.7% who were 65 years of age or older. The median age was 22 years. For every 100 females, there were 133.5 males. For every 100 females age 18 and over, there were 137.2 males.

The median income for a household in the city was $24,869, and the median income for a family was $51,510.The per capita income for the city was $18,337. About 22.5% of families and 38.3% of the population were below the poverty line.

Government
The city's elected officials consist of the mayor, a clerk, and a nine-member Common Council.

The nine-member Common Council holds the city's legislative authority and makes the laws through ordinances, orders, resolutions and motions. The city is divided into 6 districts, and the Common Council consists of one council member from each district, plus three at-large council members. Elected by the council members, the president of the Common Council presides over the council meetings and is first in the line of succession should the mayor not finish his or her term of office.

All city elected officials have a term of office of four years with no limit on the number of terms. Regular elections for all offices are held at the same time in the odd year preceding the presidential election year.

The following is a list of all mayors of West Lafayette since the position began in 1924.

Education
West Lafayette is the home of Purdue University's main campus, with an enrollment of over 40,000 students.

The West Lafayette Community School Corporation administers three schools. The school district is not coterminous with the municipality; areas annexed by the city after 2000 continue to be served by county schools. Students attend West Lafayette Elementary School (formerly Cumberland Elementary School) through third grade, while students in grades 4–6 attend West Lafayette Intermediate School. Students in the 7th grade and above attend West Lafayette Junior-Senior High School. The West Lafayette Community School Corporation is a top rated, public school district with numerous accolades. 

The Seventh-day Adventist Church operates Pleasantview SDA School which offers courses for grades K–8, and the Montessori School of Greater Lafayette teaches K–6.  There are other schools, both public and private, that have a West Lafayette address, but these are actually located outside the city limits.

Approximately 77% of West Lafayette's population age 25 or older hold a bachelor's degree or higher according to the U.S. Census 2005–2007 American Community Survey. The city ranks sixth highest on this measure among U.S. municipalities between 20,000 and 65,000 population.

In addition, the Tippecanoe School Corporation and Lafayette School Corporation operate public schools outside the West Lafayette city limits. There is also a variety of private schools in Lafayette and an Ivy Tech Community College branch.

The town has a lending library, the West Lafayette Public Library. There is also a branch of the county-run library (Tippecanoe County Public Library) in the Klondike area to the west of the city.

Economy
The economy of West Lafayette is heavily influenced by the presence of Purdue University, with an enrollment of over 50,000, more than the city's population. The university employs 12,000 people, most of whom live in either West Lafayette or Lafayette.

The  Purdue Research Park, established in 1961, is home to more than 140 companies of which nearly 100 are technology related. As of 2009, these companies employ more than 3,000. The Park offers communications infrastructure, research facilities, a business incubation complex to help start-up firms and scenic walking trails and lakes. It is one of the largest university-affiliated research parks in the United States. The Purdue Research Park is owned by Purdue Research Foundation, the University's non-profit funding and technology licensing arm.

Commercial activities, however, take place mostly across the river in Lafayette. The largest commercial area in West Lafayette is the  Wabash Landing/Levee area, which has become a thriving urban-type district since the entire area was reconstructed and the Pedestrian Bridge to Lafayette replaced the old State Street bridge. The Levee features Wabash Landing, a complex containing shops, restaurants, coffee houses, a 9-screen movie theater, a Hilton Garden Inn, and the Riverside Skating Center.

News and media
West Lafayette residents use many of the news and media outlets located in its twin city of Lafayette. Media located in West Lafayette proper include:

 The Purdue Exponent. Purdue University's independent student newspaper serving Purdue, West Lafayette, and Lafayette. Newsroom and offices located just off campus on Northwestern Avenue in West Lafayette.
 WPBI-LD 16 (Fox; NBC on LD2; ABC on LD3)
 WLFI-TV 18, (CBS; 18.2 CW; 18.3 Ion; 18.4 getTV)
 WPBY-LD 35 (ABC; MeTV/MyNetworkTV on LD2)
 WBAA Radio. (920AM, 101.3FM), a National Public Radio affiliate with studios located on the Purdue University campus
 WLQQ Radio. (106.7FM)

Transportation

Public transportation in West Lafayette is managed by the Greater Lafayette Public Transportation Corporation.

Airports
 Purdue University Airport

Highways
  Interstate 65 to Gary, Indiana (near Chicago) and Indianapolis
  US 52 to Joliet, Illinois (also near Chicago) and Indianapolis
  US 231 to Rensselaer, Indiana and Owensboro, Kentucky
  State Road 26 from Purdue University campus to Kokomo, Indiana
  State Road 43 to Brookston, Indiana and Reynolds, Indiana

Railroads
 Amtrak (Lafayette station)
 CSX Transportation
 Kankakee, Beaverville and Southern Railroad
 Norfolk Southern Railway

Points of interest

 Purdue University
 Purdue University Horticulture Gardens
 Harry's Chocolate Shop, a bar that is part of the 19th century Von's Shops building
 Fort Ouiatenon, an early French trading post
 Purdue State Bank, 1914 bank building designed by architect Louis Sullivan
 Samara (John E. Christian House), a Usonian home designed by architect Frank Lloyd Wright
 Celery Bog Nature Area and Lilly Nature Center
 Purdue Horticulture Park

Notable people
For notable residents associated with Purdue University, see List of Purdue University people.
For notable natives from the neighboring city Lafayette, Indiana, see that page.

 Brian Binnie, test pilot for SpaceShipOne
 Katie Bouman, computer scientist who was a member of the Event Horizon Telescope team that captured the first image of a black hole
 Max Mapes Ellis, American physiologist
 Bob Friend, Major League Baseball player
 Gen Fukunaga, founder of Funimation Entertainment
 Sanjay Ghemawat, computer scientist and senior fellow of Google
 Anissa Jones, actress, best known as "Buffy" on CBS' Family Affair
 Cleve Jones, conceived the AIDS quilt
 Stan Jones, educator and politician
 Tom Kelly, songwriter
 Drew Brees, NFL player
 Harry G. Leslie, governor of Indiana
 Jay McDowell, bassist for country music band BR549
 Toby Moskowitz, financial economist
 Chike Okeafor, NFL player
 Eric Rodwell, multiple world champion bridge player
 Erik Sabel, MLB player
 Randy Truitt, former member of the Indiana House of Representatives
 George Karlaftis, NFL player for the Kansas City Chiefs

References

Bibliography

External links
 City of West Lafayette, Indiana website

 
Cities in Indiana
Populated places established in 1888
Cities in Tippecanoe County, Indiana
Lafayette metropolitan area, Indiana
Articles containing video clips
1888 establishments in Indiana